Arthur Chesters (14 February 1910 – 23 March 1963) was an English footballer. His regular position was as a goalkeeper. He was born in Salford, Lancashire. He played for Exeter City and Manchester United.

External links
profile

1910 births
1963 deaths
English footballers
Manchester United F.C. players
Exeter City F.C. players
Footballers from Salford
Association football goalkeepers